Pavel Hůla (23 January 1952 – 7 December 2021) was a Czech violinist, music conductor and music teacher.

Career
Hůla became a double winner of the Kocian Violin Competition in Ústí nad Orlicí (1963 and 1964) and a laureate of the Concertino Praga radio competition in the piano trio category in 1969. He graduated from the School of Music of the Academy of Performing Arts in Prague and completed his post-graduate studies in chamber music with Antonín Kohout and Vladimir Malinin's master classes in Weimar.

He has devoted himself to solo and chamber music. For nearly three decades (1972–2000) he was a leading member of the Prague Chamber Soloists. From 1975 he was principal of the Kocian Quartet, with which he performed over 3000 concerts in 32 countries and received multiple awards (1997 Grand Prix du Disque de l'Académie Charles Cros in Paris, several Diapason d'Or and many others). From 2001 he was also the artistic director of the Praga Camerata chamber orchestra, which he founded.

In the spring of 2010, he replaced as the Pražák Quartet's primus its founding member Václav Remeš, who left the ensemble due to health reasons. In 2015 he was himself replaced, for health reasons, by Jana Vonášková-Nováková.

He also devoted himself to conducting and since 2006 was a professor at the String Instruments Department of the School of Music at the Academy of Performing Arts in Prague. He played a rare old violin, an instrument made by Mathias Albani in 1696, which Jaroslav Kocian played in his youth. 

Hůla died on 7 December 2021, at the age of 69.

References

External links

 
 

1952 births
2021 deaths
Czech violinists
Male violinists
Musicians from Prague
Academy of Performing Arts in Prague alumni
Academic staff of the Academy of Performing Arts in Prague
20th-century violinists
21st-century violinists
20th-century Czech male musicians
21st-century Czech male musicians